Mae Wat is a tambon (subdistrict) of Than To District, in Yala Province, Thailand. In 2018 it had a total population of 9,321 people.

Administration

Central administration
The tambon is subdivided into 12 administrative villages (muban).

Local administration
The area of the subdistrict is shared by 2 local governments.
the subdistrict municipality (Thesaban Tambon) Khok Chang (เทศบาลตำบลคอกช้าง)
the subdistrict administrative organization (SAO) Mae Wat (องค์การบริหารส่วนตำบลแม่หวาด)

References

External links
Thaitambon.com on Mae Wat
Mae Wat subdistrict administrative organization

Tambon of Yala Province
Populated places in Yala province